The Kaniadakis Erlang distribution (or κ-Erlang Gamma distribution) is a family of continuous statistical distributions, which is a particular case of the κ-Gamma distribution, when  and  positive integer. The first member of this family is the κ-exponential distribution of Type I. The κ-Erlang is a κ-deformed version of the Erlang distribution. It is one example of a Kaniadakis distribution.

Characterization

Probability density function 
The Kaniadakis κ-Erlang distribution has the following probability density function:

 

Cumulative distribution function 
The cumulative distribution function of κ-Erlang distribution assumes the form:

 

The cumulative Erlang distribution is recovered in the classical limit .

Survival distribution and hazard functions 
The survival function of the κ-Erlang distribution is given by:The survival function of the κ-Erlang distribution enables the determination of hazard functions in closed form through the solution of the κ-rate equation:where   is the hazard function.

Family distribution 
Such members are determined from the κ-Erlang cumulative distribution, which can be rewritten as:

 

where

 
 

with

First member 
The first member of the κ-Erlang family is the κ-Exponential distribution of type I, in which the probability density function and the cumulative distribution function are defined as:

Second member 
The second member of the κ-Erlang family has the probability density function and the cumulative distribution function defined as:

Third member 
The second member  has the probability density function and the cumulative distribution function defined as:

Related distributions 

 The κ-Exponential distribution of type I is a particular case of the κ-Erlang distribution when ;

See also 

 Giorgio Kaniadakis
 Kaniadakis statistics
 Kaniadakis distribution
 Kaniadakis κ-Exponential distribution
 Kaniadakis κ-Gaussian distribution
 Kaniadakis κ-Gamma distribution 
 Kaniadakis κ-Weibull distribution
 Kaniadakis κ-Logistic distribution

References

External links
Kaniadakis Statistics on arXiv.org

Statistics
Probability distributions
Infinitely divisible probability distributions
Continuous distributions
Exponential family distributions